Eupterote balwanti is a moth in the family Eupterotidae. It was described by Bhasin in 1946. It is found in India

References

Moths described in 1946
Eupterotinae